Extrajudicial prisoners of the United States, in the context of the early twenty-first century War on Terrorism, refers to foreign nationals the United States detains outside of the legal process required within United States legal jurisdiction. In this context, the U.S. government is maintaining torture centers, called black sites, operated by both known and secret intelligence agencies. Such black sites were later confirmed by reports from journalists, investigations, and from men who had been imprisoned and tortured there, and later released after being tortured until the CIA was comfortable they had done nothing wrong, and had nothing to hide.

Of these prisoners being held by the U.S., some were suspected of being from the senior ranks of al Qaeda, referred to in U.S. military terms as "high value detainees." According to the Swiss senator Dick Marty's reports on Secret Detentions and Illegal Transfers of Detainees involving Council of Europe Member States, about a hundred persons had been kidnapped by the CIA on European territory and subsequently rendered to countries where they were tortured.

Former Secretary of Defense, Donald Rumsfeld, had described the men detained in Camp Delta at Guantánamo Bay, Cuba, as "the worst of the worst.", despite concerns about the mental capacity of several of the detainees. But, before September 2006, many of those detainees suspected of having the highest intelligence value were not detained at Guantanamo, but were held at CIA's black sites in Eastern Europe and other countries, including Afghanistan.

In August 2010, it was reported that four high-value detainees: Abu Zubaydah, Abd al-Rahim al-Nashiri, Ramzi bin al-Shibh, and Mustafa al-Hawsawi, had first been transferred to Guantanamo on September 24, 2003. They were held at "Strawberry Fields", a secret camp in the facility constructed for their detention. Worried that a pending Supreme Court decision on habeas corpus rights might go against the Bush administration and compel releasing the men's names and other details, the CIA took back custody of the four men and moved them out of Guantanamo on March 27, 2004.

The United States Supreme Court ruled in Rasul v. Bush (2004) that detainees at Guantanamo Bay detention camp had the habeas corpus right to challenge their detentions before an impartial tribunal. As a result, the US allegedly continued to hold many ghost detainees outside Guantanamo Bay and the United States in order to avoid any review of their cases.

These four men and other high-value CIA detainees were not transferred again to military custody at Guantanamo until September 2006. At that time, the Bush administration was assured of passage by Congress of the Military Commissions Act of 2006, which included provisions preventing detainees from using habeas corpus petitions outside the newly authorized system of military tribunals.

Ghost detainees

Ghost detainees are extrajudicial prisoners whose identities have not been revealed and whose families (and frequently, governments) have not been informed of their status. They are deprived of all legal rights. Ghost detainees' identities, and capture, have been kept secret. As such they are a subset of extrajudicial prisoners, which includes all the detainees who were held in Guantanamo, etc..

Suspects held by US civilian intelligence agencies

High-value detainees
On September 6, 2006, U.S. President George W. Bush confirmed, for the first time, that the CIA had held "high-value detainees" in secret CIA prisons. He also announced that 14 senior captives were being transferred from CIA custody to military custody at Guantanamo Bay. He said that these 14 captives could expect to face charges before Guantanamo military commissions.

Critics, and elements of the FBI, had long speculated that the captives held in the secret facilities had been subjected to actual torture. They said that evidence derived from such interrogation techniques was not admissible in court and could not be used to prosecute the men.

Other captives in custody
American intelligence officials have made public the names of some of the suspects the CIA has reported to have been held. The capture of other detainees is not acknowledged. According to the US military, this is in order to spread disorder among their opponents, and fear among those who might be considering supporting them.

Legal status of detainees

Shortly after the Invasion of Afghanistan, the Bush administration announced a policy that combatants captured "on the battlefield" in Afghanistan would not be afforded the protections of POW status as described in the Geneva Conventions. This policy triggered debate both within and outside of the US government. The Bush administration claimed that the Geneva Conventions signed by the US protected only the fighters of recognized states, thus disqualifying al Qaeda fighters from these privileges as per the Bush administration's views. They argued that, since the Taliban was not a legitimate government either, their combatants did not qualify either. They saw Afghanistan as a "failed state," one without a legitimate government.

Classifying captives as illegal combatants
The Bush administration categorized such captives as "illegal combatants." These terms are not explicitly used in the Geneva Conventions, but the Third Geneva Convention of 1949 defines the term "lawful combatant", from which the term 'unlawful combatant' is derived. The Convention obliges signatories to afford captured lawful combatants significant rights and protections. Such captives are entitled to be classified as prisoners of war (POW). Internal critics within the US military and US government argue that failing to afford POW protections to combatants captured in the global war on terror would endanger American military personnel when they were captured in current and future conflicts. Other critics argue that classifying all combatants as illegal combatants is in violation of Article 5 of the Third Geneva Convention, which describes how a captor should treat combatants who are suspected of violating the Geneva Conventions such that they strip themselves of its protections. Article 5 says that combatants suspected of violations of the Conventions are to be afforded POW protection until the captors have convened a "competent tribunal." However, the Conventions never explicitly impose a limitation regarding the detention of detainees without trial during and after an armed conflict.

The Bush administration expanded the criteria for classifying captives as illegal combatants. Individuals captured around the world are now classified as such if US intelligence officials believe they have sufficient evidence to tie the individual to Islamic terrorism.

In Rasul v. Bush (2004), the US Supreme Court ruled that detainees held by the United States did have the habeas corpus right to challenge their detentions before a competent tribunal. This decision led the Bush administration to bolster the prevalence of black sites overseas.

Use of interrogation techniques
The US intelligence community has debated what techniques should be used on the detainees. The debate was triggered over the interrogation of Ibn al-Shaykh al-Libi, described as the first senior al Qaeda captive. It was reported that initially his interrogation was being conducted by the FBI because they had the most experience interrogating criminal suspects. Their interrogation approach was based on building rapport with suspects and they did not use coercive techniques. They argued that coercive techniques produced unreliable false confessions, and that using coercive techniques would mean that the evidence they gathered could not be used by the prosecution in a trial in the US judicial system.

Fear and desire for actionable intelligence led the administration to legal opinions (the Torture Memos, including the Bybee memo) by the Office of Legal Counsel, United States Department of Justice, issued to the CIA in August 2002 authorizing the use of 12 enhanced interrogation techniques (since 2009, these have been legally defined as torture and prohibited from use) with detained suspects.

Similarly, on March 14, 2003, five days before the US started its 2003 invasion of Iraq, the OLC issued a memo to William J. Haynes, General Counsel of the United States Department of Defense, concluding that federal laws against the use of torture and other coercion did not apply to interrogations overseas. In reaction to the release of the abuse pictures from Abu Ghraib in Iraq in April and May 2004, and the leak that summer of the Bybee memo, the administration advised agencies to suspend actions based on those memos. CIA suspended the use of enhanced interrogation techniques.

Legal justification for the use of "enhanced interrogation techniques"
Secretary Rumsfeld assured the world that the detainees held at the Guantanamo Bay Naval Base were going to be treated in a manner consistent with the treatment of Geneva Convention POWs. In 2004, confidential memos surfaced that discussed the limits to how much pain, discomfort and fear could be used in the interrogation of detainees in the global war on terror. The memos showed that debate within the Bush administration had been resolved in favor of what was later legally determined to be torture.

Legislative challenges to interrogation policy
In 2005, US Senator John McCain, a former POW from the Vietnam War, attached a passage to a military spending bill that would proscribe inhumane treatment of detainees and restrict US officials to use only the interrogation techniques in the US Army's field manual on interrogation.  Ninety of the one hundred Senators supported this amendment.

On Thursday, October 20, 2005, Vice President Dick Cheney proposed a change to McCain. Cheney tried to get McCain to limit the proscription to just military personnel, thus allowing CIA personnel the freedom to use harsher techniques.  McCain declined to accept Cheney's suggestion.

U.S. Government denial of allegations of mistreatment

The United States government, through the State Department, makes periodic reports to  the United Nations Committee Against Torture. In October 2005, the report focused on pretrial detention of suspects in the war on terrorism, including those held in Guantanamo Bay and Afghanistan.  This was the first official response of the U.S. government to allegations that prisoners were mistreated at Guantanamo Bay detention camp. The report denies the allegations. However, the report does not address detainees held elsewhere by the CIA.  Recently, the Director of the CIA, Michael Hayden has acknowledged that some detainees had been subject to waterboarding, in accordance with several OLC (Office of Legal Counsel) memos. General Hayden states that in February 2008, waterboarding was not part of the authorized interrogation techniques for U.S. agents.

The CIA's Inspector General investigated cases in which men were captured and transported through "erroneous renditions." There were said to be 3,000 individuals who were held in CIA custody.

Geneva Conventions compliance
On July 20, 2007, President Bush issued an executive order officially banning torture of POWs by intelligence officials. Amnesty International points out that the Bush administration has narrowly defined torture under the Bybee memo, at the time, the only known one of the Torture Memos. While the US is a signatory to the Geneva Conventions of 1949, it has failed to ratify that portion of the Geneva Convention, Protocol I, which would grant such persons POW status as the detainees at Guantanamo. The US is one of only six countries that have not.

Individuals identified as being tortured by the CIA without authorization

Location of the suspects held by US civilian intelligence agencies

See also
Arbitrary arrest and detention
Command responsibility
Detainees in Iraq
Khalid El-Masri, a German citizen wrongly detained by the CIA
Maher Arar

References

External links
"Outsourcing torture", Jane Mayer, The New Yorker, February 14, 2005
"A Tortured Debate", Newsweek, June 21, 2005
"We Don't Want a Hanoi Hilton", The Washington Post, October 27, 2005
"CIA Holds Terror Suspects in Secret Prisons", The Washington Post, November 2, 2005
"European Commission to Investigate Reports of Secret CIA Jails", The Washington Post, November 3, 2005
 "Sources Tell ABC News Top Al Qaeda Figures Held in Secret CIA Prisons", ABC News December 5, 2005
 "A list of 12 high-value targets housed by the CIA", ABC News, December 5, 2005
 "CIA 'closes terror prisons'", news.com.au, December 6, 2005
 "Victims Could Sue for Human Rights in European Court of Justice", Der Spiegel December 6, 2005
Center for Constitutional Rights website, representing detainees and working against other injustices 
"Tortured Justice: Using Coerced Evidence to Prosecute Terrorist Suspects" (2008), Human Rights First 
"In Pursuit of Justice; Prosecuting Terrorism Cases in the Federal Courts" (2009), Human Rights First 
"Undue Process: An Examination of Detention and Trials of Bagram Detainees in Afghanistan in April 2009" (2009), Human Rights First

 
Counterterrorism in the United States